Baimak is a Madang language of Papua New Guinea. It is closely related to Gal, which also goes by the name Baimak.

References

Hanseman languages
Languages of Madang Province